Héctor Luis Lemus Mena (born 12 October 1991) is a Colombian professional footballer.

Club career

Dragón 
Lemus signed with Dragón of the Salvadoran Primera División for the Apertura 2015.

Independiente FC 
Lemus signed with Independiente FC of Segunda División for the Apertura 2016. In February 2018, Lemus was successfully operated on for an injury to his left knee. This injury occurred when he played with Dragón, but the club of San Miguel did not respect his contract and did not take care of the medical expenses.

References 

1991 births
Living people
Colombian footballers
Universitario Popayán footballers
C.D. Dragón footballers
Colombian expatriate footballers
Expatriate footballers in El Salvador
Association football forwards